Star Wars and History is a book published on November 1, 2012, edited by Janice Liedl and Nancy R. Reagin.

The book, authorized by Lucasfilm, discusses how the epic film series Star Wars borrowed elements from various Earth histories.

See also
List of non-fiction Star Wars books

References

External links

Sample chapter
Star Wars and History on starwars.com
Star Wars and History on goodreads

History
2012 non-fiction books
Wiley (publisher) books
All stub articles